Silent Books are wordless picture books.

The number of silent books has increased rapidly since 2012 when the International Board on Books for Young People (IBBY) launched its “ Silent Books, from the world to Lampedusa and back” project in response to the large numbers of refugees from the Middle East and Africa on the island of Lampedusa, Greece. The first part of the project was to provide books to local and refugee children, that could be read regardless of language. This created the first library on Lampedusa. The second part of the project was to create collections of silent books: over 100 books fro20 countries were collected from the IBBY National Sections: one set was deposited at the Palazzo della Esposizioni in Rome, another at the library in Lampedusa, and another was part of a travelling exhibition. Since then, IBBY has made new collections of silent books bi-annually.

IBBY Italia has produced a guide for reading silent books "Ten Tips for reading silent books in a community that does not speak a common language". IBBY Sweden has produced a longer guide "Silent books, a handbook on wordless picture books packed with narrative power".

Silent books. Final destination Lampedusa - Collections
Individual books are nominated by IBBY National Sections, and the collections are displayed at IBBY Congresses and at the annual Bologna Children's Book Fair.

IBBY Silent Books. Final Destination Lampedusa - Collection 1 (2013)
110 books were nominated from 4 continents
Honour list:
 Daniel Defoe & Ajubel, Robinson Crusoe, Media Vaca, 2008 
 Ara Jo, 로켓 보이 (The Rocket Boy), Hansol soo book, 2011 
 Raymond Briggs, The Snowman, Puffin, 2011 [First published in 1978] 
 Katy Couprie & Antonin Louchard, Tout un monde (A whole world), Thierry Magnier, 1999 
 Suzy Lee, 파도야 놀자 (Wave), BIR Publishing Co., 2009 [First published by Chronicle Books, San Francisco, 2008] 
 Madalena Matoso, Todos Fazemos Tudo (We all do everything), Planeta Tangerina, 2011, [First published by Éditions Notari, Genève 2011] 
 Gonzalo Moure Trenor & Alicia Varela, El arenque rojo (Red the herring), SM, 2012 
 Shaun Tan, The Arrival, Lothian Children's Books, 2006 
 Marije & Ronald Tolman, De boomhut (The tree house), Uitgeverij Lemniscaat, 2009 
 David Wiesner, Flotsam, Clarion Books, 2006
HONORARY MENTION AMNESTY INTERNATIONAL:
 Nicole De Cock, Aan de overkant (On the far side), Gottmer Publishing Group, 2006
HONORARY MENTION IBBY ITALIA:
 Iela & Enzo Mari, La mela e la farfalla (The apple and the butterfly), Babalibri, 2004 [First published in 1969] 
HONORARY MENTION PALAZZO DELLE ESPOSIZIONI
 Bente Olesen Nyström, Hr. Alting (Mr. Everything), Gyldendal, 2006

IBBY Silent Books. Final Destination Lampedusa - Collection 2 (2015) 
51 books were nominated from 18 countries
Honour list:
 Ronan Badel, L’ami paresseux (The Lazy Friend) Autrement/Gecko Press, 2014 (nominated by IBBY France / IBBY New Zealand) 
 Emmi Jormalainen, Puu (TheTree) Studio Panama, 2013 (nominated by IBBY Finland) 
 Su-yeon Kim, Eoneu Badatgaeui Haru (A Day at the Beach) Borim Press, 2012 (nominated by KBBY) 
 Eva Maceková, 12 Hodin s Oskarem (12 hours with Oscar) Baobab, 2012 (nominated by IBBY Czech Republic) 
 Fanette Mellier, Dans la lune (On the Moon) Editions du Livre, 2013 (nominated by IBBY France) 
MENZIONE AUTORITA GARANTE PER L'INFANZIA E L'ADOLESCENZA:
 Patti Kim, Sonia Sánchez, Neoneun jigeum eodie inni (Where are you? Here I am) Must B Publishing Co., 2014
MENZIONE AMNESTY INTERATIONAL:
 Alison Jay, Out of the Blue, Barefoot Books, Oxford, 2014.

IBBY Silent Books. Final Destination Lampedusa - Collection 3 (2017) 
79 books were nominated from 20 countries
Honour list:
 Gregory Rogers, The boy, the bear, the baron, the bard and other dramatic tales, Allen & Unwin, Crows Nest NSW, 2015
 Niels Pieters, Vos en Goudvis, (Fox and goldfish), De Eenhoorn, Wielsbeke, 2015
 Jon Arno Lawson, Sidney Smith, Sidewalk Flowers, Groundwood Books, Toronto, 2015
 Lars Bo Peterson, Over Under, Carlsen, Copenhagen, 2016
 Bastien Contraire, Les Intrus (The intruders), Albin Michel jeunesse, Paris, 2016
 Marie Poirier, Vu d'en haut (Seen from above), Editions des Grandes Personnes, Paris, 2016
 Giovanna Zoboli, Mariachiara di Giorgio, Professione coccodrillo (Professional crocodile), Topipittori, Milano, 2017
 Maurizio A. C., Quariello, 45, Orecchio Acerbo, Roma, 2017
 Junko Murayama, Sawaru Meiro 1 & 2, (Braille mazes 1 & 2), Shogakukan, Tokyo, 2015
 Arnoud Wierstra, Babel (Babel), Gottmer, Amsterdam, 2016
 Charlotte Dematons, Holland op z'n moist (The most beautiful Holland) Leopold/Gemeentemuseum Den Haag, Amsterdam, 2015
 David Pintor, Barcelona (Barcelona), Kalandraka, Pontevedra, 2015
 Marla Frazee, The farmer and the clown, Beach Lane Books, New York, 2014.

IBBY Silent Books. Final Destination Lampedusa - Collection 4 (2019) 
67 books were nominated from 16 countries
Honour list: 
 Ayesha AlBadi, Ah, it’s inflating!, AlFulk, United Arab Emirates 2018
 Marta Bartolj, Kje Si? (Where are you?), Miš založba, Dob 2018
 Ilan Brenman, Guilherme Karsten, Engaños (Tricks), V&R Editoras, Buenos Aires/Ciudad de México 2017 (ed. or. Melhoramentos, Brasil 2015) 
 Jorge Campos, Alter-Nativo (Alter-Native), Aira Editorial, Baixo 2017
 Icinori, E poi, Orecchio Acerbo, Roma 2018 (ed.or. Albin Michel Jeunesse, Paris 2018)
 Eva Lindström, Limpan är sugen (Sizzler is peckish), En bok för alla, Stockholm 2017
 Sven Nordqvist, Hundpromenaden (The Dog Walk), Opal, Bromma 2018
 Nazli Tahvili, Chalk Eagle, Tiny Owl, London 2018
 Judith Vanistendael, Blokje om (Round the block), Querido Kinderboeken, Amsterdam 2018
 Geert Vervaeke, Tierendium. Een kijk-en zoekboek (Zoo. A search-and-find book), Lannoo, Tielt 
MENZIONE SPECIALE PALAZZO DELLE ESPOSIZIONI:
 Sassafras de Bruyn, De jager en zijn hond: een wonderlijke reis door de wereld van Bruegel (The Hunter and his Dog – A journey through the wonderous world of Bruegel), Lannoo, Tielt, 2018 
MENZIONE SPECIALE AMNESTY INTERNATIONAL:
 Ji Hyeon Lee, La porta (The door), Orecchio Acerbo, Roma 2018 (ed. or. Iyagikot Publishing, Seoul 2017)

IBBY Silent Books. Final Destination Lampedusa - Collection 5 (2021) 
76 books were nominated from 22 countries
Honour list 2021:
 Stedho (Steven Dhondt), Daan Quichot: De spaghetti van opa Pier (Daan Quichot: Grandpa Pier's spaghetti), Baeckens Books, Mechelen, 2019 (Belgium)
 Peter Van den Ende, Zwerveling (The wanderer), Lannoo, Tielt, 2020 (Belgium)
 Cécile Gariép, Objet perdu (Lost object), Les Éditions de la Pastèque, Montreal, 2019 (Canada) 
 Kinga Rofusz, Otthon (Home), Vivandra books, Budapest, 2018 (Hungary)
 Javier Sáez-Castán & Manuel Marsol, Museum, Orecchio acerbo, Rome, 2019 (Italy)
 Group Mokomoko, Sanbiki no kobuta (The three little pigs: cloth picture book), Group Mokomoko, Tokyo, 2020 (Japan) 
 Deok-Kyu Choi, 커다란 손 (Father big hands), YUNedition, Goyang, 2020 (Korea) 
 Jeon Mihwa, 그러던 어느 날 (Then one day), Munhakdongne Publishing Group, Seoul, 2019 (Korea) 
 Rajendra Bhakta Joshi & Binita Buddhacharya, चङ्गा (Kite), Nepalese Society for Children's Literature, Kathmandu, 2020 (Nepal)
 Ram Kumar Pande & Dev Koimee, नेपाल र यती(Nepaland Yati), Nepalese Society for Children's  Literature, Kathmandu, 2020 (Nepal) 
 Yanik Coat, Aleph, Gecko Press, Wellington, 2018 (orig. Albin Michel, Paris 2017) (New Zealand) 
 Karin Cyren, Maraton, Lilla Piratförlaget, Stockholm, 2019 (Sweden)
 Albertine, Séraphine : l’anniversaire (Séraphine: the birthday), La Joie de lire, Geneva, 2020 (Switzerland)
 Mies van Hout, Guck-Guck! Dreieckig (Peekaboo! Triangle), Aracari Verlag, Zurich, 2018 (Switzerland)
 Mies van Hout, Guck-Guck! Viereckig (Peekaboo! Rectangle), Aracari Verlag, Zurich, 2018 (Switzerland)
 Mies van Hout, Guck-Guck! Rund (Peekaboo! Round), Aracari Verlag, Zurich, 2018 (Switzerland)

See also
 Silent Book Contest
 International Board on Books for Young Readers
 Bologna Children's Book Fair

References

Illustration
Picture books
Visual arts media